The Night Atlanta Burned is the forty-sixth studio album by Chet Atkins, credited to "The Atkins String Co." — a quartet comprising Chet, Johnny Gimble, Paul Yandell and Lisa Silver. The album is a fusion of classical musical techniques with country, folk and bluegrass.

The liner notes are by John D. Loudermilk, discussing the burning of Atlanta and the Atlanta Conservatory of Music during the American Civil War.

Reception

Writing for Allmusic, critic Richard S.  Ginell wrote of the album "With all the hype about the Yo-Yo Ma/Mark O'Connor/Edgar Meyer Appalachia Waltz projects of the 1990s, it's enlightening to discover the seeds of that classical/country/bluegrass fusion right here, some 20 years ahead of the game."

Reissues
 The Night Atlanta Burned was re-released on CD in 2007 packaged with The First Nashville Guitar Quartet on Raven Records.

Track listing

Side one
 "Sonora" (John D. Loudermilk) – 3:20
 "Mostly Mozart" (Mozart) – 3:51
 "Bill Cheatham" (Traditional) – 2:41
 "San Antonio Stroll" (Noah) – 2:46
 "To Ann" (Loudermilk) – 2:05

Side two
 "The Night Atlanta Burned" (Loudermilk) – 2:16
 "Carnavalito" (Zaldivar) – 3:12
 "The Women of Ireland" (Traditional) – 2:28
 "Scotland" (Monroe) – 2:33
 "Odd Folks of Okracoke" (Loudermilk) – 2:03

Personnel
Chet Atkins - guitar
Johnny Gimble - mandolin
Paul Yandell - guitar
Lisa Silver - violin, viola

Production notes
Produced by Bob Ferguson and Chet Atkins
Engineered by Chuck Seitz and Bill Vandervert
Technicians: Al Patchucki, George Bennett, Bubba Campbell

References

Chet Atkins albums
1975 albums
Albums produced by Chet Atkins
Albums produced by Bob Ferguson (music)
RCA Records albums